Radha Ramana is a 1943 Indian Kannada language drama film directed by Jyotish Sinha. Produced by actress M. V. Rajamma, the film was notably the first in Kannada cinema to have a woman producer. The film featured B. R. Panthulu and Rajamma playing the lead roles along with actors Balakrishna and G. V. Iyer making their respective acting debuts in the film. Both these actors went on to become one of the finest character artists in Kannada cinema.

Cast
 B. R. Panthulu
 M. V. Rajamma
 Balakrishna
 G. V. Iyer
 Srinivasa Rao

References

External sources

 - a song sung by M. V. Rajamma from this film

1943 films
1940s Kannada-language films
Indian drama films
Indian black-and-white films
Films directed by B. R. Panthulu
1943 drama films